Peoria Waterworks is a building complex built in 1890 for the Peoria, Illinois water system. The three building site was constructed in 1890 after the publicly owned Peoria Water Company was sold to John T. Moffat and Henry C. Hodgskins. The building was designed in Romanesque Revival style and first supplied water to the city of Peoria on December 1, 1890. The three structures, Pumping Station #1, Pumping Station #2 and the Main Well House, were included on the property's listing on the U.S. National Register of Historic Places on March 18, 1980.

Notes

Buildings and structures in Peoria, Illinois
National Register of Historic Places in Peoria County, Illinois
Water supply infrastructure on the National Register of Historic Places
Industrial buildings and structures on the National Register of Historic Places in Illinois
Industrial buildings and structures in Illinois
Water treatment facilities
Former pumping stations